Colombine may refer to:

 Monte Colombine, Lombardy, Italy; a mountain
 Columbina or Colombine, a stock character, and Harlequin's mistress
 "Colombine", a 1920 poem by Hugh McCrae
 Colombine, a 19th century ship; see List of shipwrecks in June 1842
 Colombine, a sailing yacht that participated in sailing at the 1900 Summer Olympics

See also

 Columbine (disambiguation) 
 Columbina (disambiguation) 
 Columbian (disambiguation) 
 Columbiana (disambiguation) 
 Columbia (disambiguation) 
 Columbiad (disambiguation) 
 Colombina (disambiguation) 
 Colombino (disambiguation) 
 Colombian (disambiguation) 
 Colombiana (disambiguation) 
 Colombia (disambiguation)